Crouton (ChromiumOS Universal Chroot Environment) is a set of scripts which allows Ubuntu, Debian, and Kali Linux systems to run parallel to a ChromeOS system. Crouton works by using a chroot instead of dual-booting to allow a user to run desktop environments at the same time: ChromeOS and another environment of the user's choice.

In Google I/O 2019, Google announced all Chromebooks shipped that year onward will be Linux compatible out of the box.

Usage 
Crouton requires you to switch your ChromeOS device to Developer Mode. This requires a full "Powerwash" of the device. Once you get it up and running, you use special commands in the Crosh terminal. Despite having many Linux distributions to choose from, none are officially supported by their developers. While Crostini has become an officially supported way to run Linux applications, Many people still prefer Crouton due to the fact it allows you to install a desktop environment.

References

External links 
 Crouton on GitHub
 Crouton on reddit
 Crouton Central on Google forums
 Crouton Users on Google+ Communities

Linux software